Poręba Wielka may refer to:

Poręba Wielka, Limanowa County in Lesser Poland Voivodeship (south Poland)
Poręba Wielka, Oświęcim County in Lesser Poland Voivodeship (south Poland)